= Spanish Room Formation =

- Stratigraphic range: Mississippian – Pennsylvanian
- Type: Formation

Lithology
- Primary: Marine Sediments

Location
- Region: Newfoundland
- Country: Canada
- Occurrence of the Spanish Room Formation in southeastern Newfoundland

The Spanish Room Formation is a formation cropping out in Newfoundland.
